In algebra, a simplicial Lie algebra is a simplicial object in the category of Lie algebras. In particular, it is a simplicial abelian group, and thus is subject to the Dold–Kan correspondence.

See also 
Differential graded Lie algebra

References

External links 
http://ncatlab.org/nlab/show/simplicial+Lie+algebra

Lie algebras